Ibedul Yutaka Miller Gibbons (17 January 1944 – 4 November 2021) was a Palauan activist. He was the high chief of Koror and the Chairman of the Council of Chiefs.

Life
Gibbons was born in Palau in 1944. He worked as a United States Army cook before becoming High Chief. He fought against the presence of United States nuclear weapons in Palau. In 1979, a constitution was approved that prohibited the use, testing, storage or disposal of nuclear, chemical and biological weapons in Palau. He won the Right Livelihood Award in 1983. He ran for president in the 1984, 1988 and 1996 Palauan general election. In 1997, he approved the new flag of Koror. He died in a Taiwan hospital on November 4, 2021 at the age of 77.

Filmography

Notes

References

1944 births
2021 deaths
Ibeduls of Koror
People from Koror
Palauan politicians of Chinese descent
Palauan activists